Heidelberg Township is the name of some places in the U.S. state of Pennsylvania:

Heidelberg Township, Berks County, Pennsylvania
Heidelberg Township, Lebanon County, Pennsylvania
Heidelberg Township, Lehigh County, Pennsylvania
Heidelberg Township, York County, Pennsylvania

See also 
 Lower Heidelberg Township, Berks County, Pennsylvania
 North Heidelberg Township, Berks County, Pennsylvania
 South Heidelberg Township, Berks County, Pennsylvania

Pennsylvania township disambiguation pages